Phoney Photos is a 1918 American silent comedy film featuring Stan Laurel.

Cast
 Stan Laurel	
 Walter Belasco
 Neal Burns
 Rena Rogers
 Lydia Yeamans Titus

See also
 List of American films of 1918

External links

1918 films
Silent American comedy films
American silent short films
American black-and-white films
1918 comedy films
1918 short films
American comedy short films
1910s American films